Nikola Pešić was born in Belgrade in 1973. He graduated from the Academy of Fine Arts in Belgrade with the degree of painting, although he completed his master's degree in sculpture in class of Professor Mrđan Bajić in 1998.

In 1999 he got the scholarship from German Academic Exchange Service (DAAD) when he went to Stuttgart, where he finished his post-graduate studies at the  State Academy of Fine Arts (germ:Staatliche Akademie der Bildenden Kuenste) in the class of Professor Micha Ullman.

Pešić's works (sculptures, objects) have been represented at many important exhibitions in Serbia (Oktobarski salon) and at different art fairs in Europe (Viennafair in Vienna and Art Fair in Cologne) by Zvono Gallery.

Nikola Pešić is a member of ULUS (Visual Artists Association of Serbia).

Pešić's art 
Nikola Pešić's art consists of highly esthetic objects which hide and generate at the same time different meanings by means of their simple pleasing forms and lines. The interpretation of Pešić's art is based on symbolic models of Christianity, gnosticism and non-Christian religions. According to Nikola, art must be attractive "at first sight". His sculptures are made of transparent and dim polyesters, epoxy and acrylic resins, magnifying glasses, mirrors, brass and other polished and reflecting materials. Even though Pesic  tries to achieve perfection, he rarely uses machines when manufacturing his sculptures, and he usually does everything manually. As he himself says: "My sculptures should reflect my wish to make something perfect, and at the same time the impossibility to do it. I think that the manually shaped forms have special enchant and power.

One of the characteristics of Pesić's art is absolute absence of politics in his works. Pesić, if looks some political idol at all, he looks for it in bogumils, cathars and gnostics, because like them, he does not have any need to belong to any state, political option or church.

Exhibitions

Selection of the group exhibitions 

39. October Salon, 25 May Museum, Belgrade, 1998
From April to April, Andrićev venac Gallery, Belgrade, 1998
III Yugoslav Biennal of Youth, Konkordija, Vršac, 1998
Art Critic's Selection, Gallery of The Belgrade Cultural Center, Belgrade, 1998
40. October Salon, 25 May Museum, Belgrade, 1999
Internationale Biennale neues Aquarell, Kleinsassen, 1999
Selection From the Nineties, Museum of Contemporary Art, Belgrade, 2000
En Fin, Unesco Gallery, Paris, 2000
Niveau, Schloss Solitude, Stuttgart, 2001
42. October Salon, Marija Dragojlović's selection, Belgrade 2001
V Yugoslav Biennal of Youth, Konkordija, Vrsac, 2002
43. October Salon, Belgrade, 2002
Funkshion, Miami Beach, USA, 2004
37. Herceg Novi Winter Art Salon, Herceg Novi, 2004
20/21, ZVONO Gallery, Belgrade, 2005
46. October Salon, Belgrade, 2005

Solo exhibitions 

Objects and Sculptures, ZVONO Gallery, Belgrade, 1997
Bad Time Stories, ZVONO Gallery, Belgrade, 1998
One Two Three, Youth Center Gallery, Belgrade, 2000
Material World, ZVONO Gallery, Belgrade, 2002
Sofort Waschen, ZVONO Gallery, Belgrade, 2003

Art fairs 

Viennafair, Vienna, 2005, 2006
Art Fair, Cologne, 2006

References

External links 

 Nikola Pešić at Zvono Gallery web site
 Nikola Pešić at www.artefacts.net

Living people
1973 births
Artists from Belgrade